Acnodon is a genus of serrasalmids found in South America, with three recognized species:
 Acnodon normani Gosline, 1951 (sheep-pacu)
 Acnodon oligacanthus (J. P. Müller & Troschel, 1844)
 Acnodon senai Jégu & dos Santos, 1990

References

Serrasalmidae
Fish of South America
Taxa named by Carl H. Eigenmann